Zachary David Phillips (born September 21, 1986) is a Mexican-American professional baseball pitcher for the Rieleros de Aguascalientes of the Mexican Baseball League. He was drafted by the Texas Rangers in the 23rd round  in 2005, and has played in Major League Baseball (MLB) for the Baltimore Orioles, Miami Marlins, and Pittsburgh Pirates, and in Nippon Professional Baseball (NPB) for the Hiroshima Toyo Carp.

Career

Texas Rangers
He was drafted by the Texas Rangers in the 23rd round of the 2005 amateur draft, being signed by scout Tim Fortugno.

Phillips began his professional career in 2005, playing for the AZL Rangers (14 games) and Clinton LumberKings (two games), going a combined 1-3 with a 4.14 ERA in 16 games (11 starts). In  innings, he struck out 77 batters. He spent all of 2006 with the LumberKings, going 5-23 with a 5.96 ERA in 28 starts. The following year, he played for the Clinton again and went 11-7 with a 2.91 ERA in 27 starts, striking out 157 batters in  innings of work. In 2008, he went 8-9 with a 5.54 ERA in 28 starts for the Bakersfield Blaze.

For the 2009 season, Phillips converted to relief pitching and went a combined 2-3 with a 1.39 ERA in 36 combined games for the Blaze (16 games) and Frisco RoughRiders (20 games). He began the 2010 season with the RoughRiders but was later promoted to the Oklahoma City RedHawks.

On July 14, 2011, the Texas Rangers designated Phillips for assignment, giving them 10 days to trade, release, or outright him to the minors.

Baltimore Orioles
On July 19, 2011, he was traded to the Baltimore Orioles for minor league infielder Nick Green and cash. He made his Major League debut for the Orioles on August 31, 2011, against the Toronto Blue Jays. He appeared in 10 games in 2011, with a 1.13 ERA in 8 innings pitched.

On November 4, 2012, Phillips elected free agency after refusing his outright assignment to the Triple-A Norfolk Tides.

Miami Marlins
Phillips signed a minor league deal with the Miami Marlins before the 2013 season. After not making the team, he was assigned to the Triple-A New Orleans Zephyrs, where he spent most of the season. In 50 games with the Zephyrs, he went 4-2 with a 2.44 ERA and a save, striking out 74 in 59 innings. On September 1, he was called up by the Marlins. Phillips appeared in 3 games with Miami, where he went 0-1 while giving up 1 run in 1.2 innings. He was outrighted off the roster on October 7, 2013, and elected to become a free agent.

Hiroshima Toyo Carp
On October 28, 2013, Phillips signed a one-year deal with the Hiroshima Toyo Carp of Nippon Professional Baseball, including a signing bonus of $154k. In nine relief appearances for Hiroshima in 2014, Phillips went 1-0 with a 3.27 ERA.

Chicago White Sox
On December 15, 2014, he signed a minor league contract with the Chicago White Sox. On December 17, 2014, he was assigned to AAA Charlotte Knights.

He was outrighted and elected free agency on March 18, 2016.

Return to Baltimore
Phillips signed a one-year contract with the Baltimore Orioles on March 23, 2016. On April 1, he was outrighted to Triple-A.

Pittsburgh Pirates
The Pittsburgh Pirates acquired Phillips from Baltimore on August 31, 2016, in exchange for left-handed pitcher Kyle Lobstein. He was sent to the Triple-A Indianapolis Indians.  He was brought up to the Pirates on September 13. He was outrighted on November 2, 2016.

St. Louis Cardinals
On November 18, 2016, Phillips signed a minor league deal with the St. Louis Cardinals. Phillips was also invited to major league spring training. He was released on June 15, 2017.

Acereros de Monclova
On June 24, 2017, Phillips signed with the Acereros de Monclova of the Mexican Baseball League. In 2018, he was naturalized as a Mexican and no longer occupied a foreign spot in the Mexican Baseball League. On February 26, 2019, He was selected Mexico national baseball team at 2019 exhibition games against Japan. Phillips did not play in a game in 2020 due to the cancellation of the Mexican League season because of the COVID-19 pandemic.

Rieleros de Aguascalientes
On July 13, 2022, Phillips was loaned to the Rieleros de Aguascalientes of the Mexican League for the remainder of the 2022 season. On September 23, 2022, the Acereros officially traded Phillips to the Rieleros, making the loan permanent.

References

External links

1986 births
Living people
Acereros de Monclova players
American emigrants to Mexico
American expatriate baseball players in Japan
American expatriate baseball players in Mexico
Arizona League Rangers players
Bakersfield Blaze players
Baseball players from Sacramento, California
Baltimore Orioles players
Charlotte Knights players
Clinton LumberKings players
Frisco RoughRiders players
Hiroshima Toyo Carp players
Indianapolis Indians players
Leones de Ponce players
Major League Baseball pitchers
Memphis Redbirds players
Mexican baseball players
Mexican League baseball pitchers
Miami Marlins players
New Orleans Zephyrs players
Nippon Professional Baseball pitchers
Norfolk Tides players
Oklahoma City RedHawks players
Pittsburgh Pirates players
Round Rock Express players
Sacramento City Panthers baseball players
Tomateros de Culiacán players